is a passenger railway station located in the city of Fuchū, Tokyo, Japan, operated by the private railway operator Keio Corporation. It is numbered "KO24".

Lines

Station layout
This station consists of two island platforms serving four tracks, with each platform on a passing loop.

Platforms

History
The station opened on 31 October 1916. The new elevated station building opened on 1 March 1993.

Passenger statistics
In fiscal 2019, the station was used by an average of 88,769 passengers daily. 

The passenger figures (boarding passengers only) for previous years are as shown below.

Surrounding area

 Fuchū City Office
 
 Fuchū-Hommachi Station on the JR  Musashino Line and  Nambu Line

See also
 List of railway stations in Japan

References

External links

  

Keio Line
Stations of Keio Corporation
Railway stations in Tokyo
Railway stations in Japan opened in 1916
Fuchū, Tokyo